The King in the Window is a children's novel written by American author Adam Gopnik.  Published in 2005 by Hyperion Books, the novel is about an American boy named Oliver who lives in Paris.  Oliver stumbles into an ancient battle waged between Window Wraiths and the malicious Master of Mirrors, when the American boy is mistaken for a mystical king.

Plot summary

On the night of Epiphany, after enjoying his piece of Epiphany kingcake and wearing a gold paper crown, Oliver gazes out the window. He is approached by a haunting vision of another boy in the reflection. This mysterious boy is a window wraith, and he mistakes Oliver for the new king.  The window wraith boy calls Oliver to wield his sword and reclaim the kingdom, luring him into a journey of self-discovery that could save the world.

The window wraiths are a cadre of France's deceased poets and artists, such as Molière, who claim Oliver as the king who will save them from the evil force dwelling behind the mirrors of the world capturing the souls of those who stare too long. The element of mirrors in the book is also an ode to Lewis Carroll's Through the Looking-Glass and there is also a pivotal character who is a descendant of Alice Liddell.

Background

In a 2005 interview with Charlie Rose, Gopnik explained that he was inspired to write the novel when he saw his own son celebrate Epiphany in Paris. Gopnik worked as a journalist in Paris just like Oliver's father in the book.

2005 American novels
American children's novels
Children's fantasy novels
Novels set in Paris
2005 children's books